Kingdom University (KU) is a private university in Bahrain offering tertiary education and training, founded in 2001.

Brief History

Kingdom University obtained its license in 2001, though it started student intake only in 2004 on a temporary campus that was located in Manama. In July 2013, the university moved to its new permanent campus in Riffa (Al-Hajiyat), Bahrain. The new campus provides a fresh and promising learning environment and study facilities. In 2016, the university embarked on a significant expansion which includes the development of a new six-story academic building and an extension of car parks.

The university began in 2004 with approximately 67 students and has rapidly grown since then to reach more than 1800 alumni by the end of 2015 from the different colleges (Law, Arts, Business Administration, IT, & Architectural Engineering & Design).

Kingdom University received recognition from the Quality Assurance Authority for Education and Training (QAAET) for almost all of its programs.

The university president is Prof. Yusuf AbdulGhaffar since January 2004.

Colleges
 College of Law
 College of Architectural Engineering and Design
 College of Business Administration

Certificates Granted by Kingdom University

Associate Diploma 
All colleges and majors except the College of Architectural Engineering and Design

Bachelors Degree 
 Bachelor of Law
 Bachelor of Architectural Engineering
 Bachelor of Interior Design
 Bachelor of Business Administration
 Bachelor of Finance and Banking
 Bachelor of Finance and Accounting (ACCA Accredited)

Recognition & Student Achievements

66% of Kingdom University Alumni are employed within a year of graduation and 25% are in leading positions in the market.

Among Kingdom University awards are the following:

 First Prize and Third Prize in the Architectural Contest for the Schools of Architecture among universities in the Persian Gulf region for designing the mosque in 2009
 The university was awarded the e-Government Excellence Award in 2010
 First Prize: Shaikh Nasser Award in the category of Architecture Design in 2011 (College of Architectural Engineering and Design)
 First Prize: Shaikh Nasser Award in the category of Photography in 2011 (College of Architectural Engineering and Design)
 First Prize Debate Contest organized by Ministry of Youth & Sports Bahrain in 2012

On-Campus Activities:

 First Prize in Student Camping Bahrain 2008
 First Prize in the Football Championship at the University Level in 2009- Bahrain Organized by NYIT
 First Prize in Football Championships at the level of all Universities in Bahrain 2010
 Photo Gallery Exhibition conducted by Kingdom University in 2009. Proceeds of the exhibition is being donated for the benefit of the citizens of Gaza
 Exhibition conducted in Kuwait by the Kingdom University for International Exhibition for Education in March 2009.
 Exhibition conducted by the Kingdom University for Interior Designing in 2009
 First Prize in the Bowling Championship at the University Level in 2011
 First Prize in Bowling Championship at the University Level in 2012

References

External links
 Kingdom University
 

Universities in Bahrain
Educational institutions established in 2001
2001 establishments in Bahrain